The Jay Cooke House (also known as Cooke Castle), is a historic summer estate house on Gibraltar Island, an island in the Lake Erie community of Put-in-Bay, Ohio.  Built in 1865, it was the summer house and a favorite place of financier Jay Cooke (1821–1905).  Since 1925, the former Cooke estate has hosted the Stone Laboratory of Ohio State University, one of the nation's oldest freshwater field research stations.  The estate, encompassing the entire  island, was declared a National Historic Landmark in 1966.

Description and history
Gibraltar Island is a minor island associated with South Bass Island in southwestern Lake Erie, located inside the cove known as Put-in-Bay, where the village of Put-in-Bay is located.  The 8-acre island is roughly lozenge-shaped, with an elongation at its southwestern end.  The Cooke Castle is located east of the geographic center of the island, and is the easternmost of the buildings on the island.  It is three stories in height, built out of stone with wooden trim.  Its most prominent feature is a four-story octagonal tower, topped with a Gothic Revival crenellated parapet.  The single-story front porch is also topped by crenellations, with rounded-arch openings flanked by square columns.  The interior features elaborate woodwork, with a fine marble fireplace in the parlor.

The island was purchased by Jay Cooke in 1865, and the house was built soon afterward.  Cooke, a native of Sandusky, had played a pivotal role in financing the war effort Union side in the American Civil War, selling near one billion dollars of war bonds to large and small buyers alike.  He regularly spent time here after building the house, typically spending three weeks in the spring, and again in late summer.  He was forced to sell the island in 1874, having suffered bankruptcy due to the Panic of 1873, but recovered some of his fortune and repurchased the property in 1880.  The island was acquired by Ohio State University in 1925, which established its freshwater research center there.

See also
National Register of Historic Places listings in Ottawa County, Ohio
List of National Historic Landmarks in Ohio

References

External links

National Historic Landmarks in Ohio
Houses on the National Register of Historic Places in Ohio
Historic American Buildings Survey in Ohio
Houses in Ottawa County, Ohio
National Register of Historic Places in Ottawa County, Ohio
Houses completed in 1865
Ohio State University